Roxana Gatzel (former Han; born 28 May 1980) is a Romanian handball player. She plays for the Romanian club CS Măgura Cisnădie.

Individual awards
 Romanian National League Top Scorer: 2016

References 

Living people
Sportspeople from Craiova
Romanian female handball players 
1980 births